John Gregory Smith (July 22, 1818 – November 6, 1891) was a Vermont businessman and politician.  He is most notable for serving as the 28th governor of Vermont from 1863 to 1865, the last of Vermont's Civil War chief executives.

Biography

Smith was born in 1818 in St. Albans, Vermont, son of John Smith and Maria (Curtis) Smith.  His father was a pioneer railroad builder in Vermont, and a leading lawyer and political figure. He served one term in the US Congress, beginning in 1839.

J. Gregory Smith graduated from the University of Vermont in 1838, where he was a founding member of the Lambda Iota Society, and attended Yale Law School. In 1842, he received his Master of Arts degree from the University of Vermont. In 1877 the university awarded him the honorary degree of LL.D.

In 1842, Smith married Ann Eliza Brainerd, daughter of U.S. Senator Lawrence Brainerd. She became prominent in her own right as the author of several novels and other books.  After the death of her father, J. Gregory Smith named Brainerd, Minnesota in honor of his wife's family. He is considered the founder as he selected this site as president of the Northern Pacific Railroad for a crossing of the upper Mississippi River, thus stimulating the town's growth.

Smith's brother Worthington also became a politician, serving in Congress from 1867 to 1871. His son Edward served as governor from 1898 to 1900.  In addition, F. Stewart Stranahan was married to Ann Eliza Smith's sister, and Stranahan became prominent in the Smith family businesses before serving as Lieutenant Governor from 1892 to 1894.

Career
Smith became associated with his father in his law practice and railroad management.  After his father's death in 1858, he succeeded to the position of trustee under the lease of the Vermont and Canada Railroad.  Simultaneously he entered politics, and for many years the career in each line was involved with the other.  He was also one of the originators of the Northern Pacific Railway enterprise and was the president of the corporation from 1866 to 1872.  Under his lead five hundred and fifty-five miles of the road were built. The family holdings included the St. Albans Foundry, the National Car Company, and the Vermont Iron and Car Company.

Smith was elected to the Vermont Senate in 1858, and reelected in 1859.  He served in the Vermont House of Representatives from 1860 to 1863, and in 1862 and 1863 he served as Speaker.

In 1863 he was elected governor, succeeding Frederick Holbrook, and he was re-elected in 1864. His efforts in office were centered on the American Civil War, including obtaining medical care for Vermont soldiers at the front, and securing the right of soldiers in the field to vote by absentee ballot.

His home was a target of the Confederate St. Albans Raid.  He was not at home, but his wife was, and her appearance at the front door carrying an unloaded pistol (the only weapon she could find) was enough to cause the raiders to decide to bypass the Smith home while fleeing to Canada.

Following his governorship Smith returned to his business interests, including serving as president of the Northern Pacific Railroad from 1866 to 1872.  He was chairman of the state delegation to the Republican National Conventions in 1872, 1880, and 1884.  After his retirement as governor he held no public office.   He was mentioned as a candidate for the United States Senate in 1886 and 1891, but in both cases he withdrew his name.

Death
Smith died in St. Albans on November 6, 1891, and was interred at Greenwood Cemetery.

References

Further reading
Ullery, Jacob G., Men of Vermont: An Illustrated Biographical History, Brattleboro, VT: Transcript Publishing Company, 1894, Part I, p. 96.

External links
 
 Inventory of the J. Gregory Smith Papers, Leahy Library, Vermont Historical Society
National Governors Association
The Political Graveyard

1818 births
1891 deaths
Republican Party governors of Vermont
Republican Party Vermont state senators
Speakers of the Vermont House of Representatives
People of Vermont in the American Civil War
University of Vermont alumni
Yale Law School alumni
People from St. Albans, Vermont
Republican Party members of the Vermont House of Representatives
Vermont lawyers
Union (American Civil War) state governors
19th-century American railroad executives
19th-century American politicians
Burials in Vermont
19th-century American lawyers